Thomas Flood may refer to:

 Thomas S. Flood (Medal of Honor) (1840–?), American Civil War sailor and Medal of Honor recipient
 Thomas H. Flood (1804–1873), Delegate and Senator to the General Assembly of Virginia
 Thomas S. Flood (politician) (1844–1908), U.S. Representative from New York
 Thomas Flood (astronomer) (1919–1988), Scottish amateur astronomer
 Tom Flood (born 1955), Australian novelist
 Tom Flood (footballer) (fl. 1909–1918), Scottish footballer
 Tim Flood (baseball) (Thomas Timothy Flood, 1877–1929), American baseball player